Georgia Katie Davis (born 3 June 1999) is an English cricketer who currently plays for Warwickshire, Central Sparks and Trent Rockets. She plays as a right-arm off break bowler. She previously played for Yorkshire Diamonds in the Women's Cricket Super League.

Early life
Davis was born on 3 June 1999 in Birmingham.

Domestic career
Davis made her county debut in 2015, for Warwickshire against Surrey. In her first season, she took 7 wickets at an average of 12.14 in the 2015 Women's Twenty20 Cup. Over the following seasons, Davis was most effective for Warwickshire in the Twenty20 Cup, taking 11 wickets at an average of 11.09 in 2017 and 14 wickets at 10.42 in 2018. In 2019, she was Warwickshire's leading wicket-taker in the County Championship, taking 12 wickets including her List A best bowling of 4/18. She also helped her side to victory in the 2019 Women's Twenty20 Cup that season, taking 7 wickets in the tournament, including 3 in the deciding match against Lancashire. In the 2021 Women's Twenty20 Cup, Davis took 7 wickets at an average of 8.71. In the 2022 Women's Twenty20 Cup, Davis was the joint-second leading wicket-taker across the entire competition, with 13 wickets at an average of 10.75. Against Gloucestershire, she took 5/14 from her four overs, her maiden Twenty20 five-wicket haul.

Davis also played for Yorkshire Diamonds in the 2019 Women's Cricket Super League. She played two matches, but did not bat or bowl.

In 2020, Davis played for Central Sparks in the Rachael Heyhoe Flint Trophy. She appeared in two matches, taking four wickets at an average of 20.25, including taking 3/29 against North West Thunder. In 2021, she took nine wickets for the side in the Rachael Heyhoe Flint Trophy with an economy of just 3.80, as well as taking eight wickets in the Charlotte Edwards Cup, the most for her side. She also played for Trent Rockets in The Hundred, appearing in 5 matches and taking two wickets. In 2022, Davis played six matches for Central Sparks, all in the Rachael Heyhoe Flint Trophy, taking four wickets. She also played five matches for Trent Rockets in The Hundred, taking two wickets at an average of 18.50. In January 2023, it was announced that Davis had signed her first professional contract with Central Sparks.

References

External links

1999 births
Living people
Cricketers from Birmingham, West Midlands
Warwickshire women cricketers
Yorkshire Diamonds cricketers
Central Sparks cricketers
Trent Rockets cricketers